Gennady Chibisov (September 23, 1946 – August 7, 2008) was a Soviet/Russian cosmologist. He obtained his PhD in 1972, from the Moscow Institute of Physics and Technology, with a thesis entitled "Entropy perturbations in cosmology". He is best known for his 1981 paper
on the origin of cosmological density perturbations from quantum fluctuations, coauthored with Viatcheslav Mukhanov. This is the earliest of a number of calculations addressing the origin of density fluctuations in inflationary cosmology, which is the most common hypothesis for the origin of the expanding universe and the structure within it.
The Mukhanov-Chibisov paper was part of the work honoured by the 2013 Gruber Prize in Cosmology.

Publications

See also 

Lebedev institute, Moscow

References 

1946 births
Soviet cosmologists
Soviet physicists
20th-century Russian physicists
Moscow Institute of Physics and Technology alumni
2008 deaths